Solomon Wilbur Denton Sr. (1816–1864) was an early member of the Latter Day Saint movement.

Early life
Denton was born in Fitchville, Huron County, Ohio.

In the Latter Day Saint church
In 1831, Denton joined Joseph Smith's Church of Christ and moved to Independence, Missouri to join the Latter Day Saints there. On March 1, 1835, he was ordained an elder in the church.
Denton worked with Don Carlos Smith in the Kirtland, Ohio printing office of the church.  In 1835, he married Fanny M. Stanley (Smith's first cousin once removed). He reported "having seen a great vision during the time of the washings and the annointings" in the Kirtland Temple. Denton was also a helper in Smith's household.

In 1835, Denton issued a sworn statement claiming that he had been part of a plot to murder Grandison Newell.

Later life
In 1837, Denton was excommunicated from the church for "lack of faith, non-observance of duties, and contempt of the quorum of High Priests." He moved to Pontiac, Michigan, where he was co-editor of a newspaper and later postmaster. Denton died in Pontiac.

References

1816 births
1864 deaths
American male journalists
Michigan postmasters
Converts to Mormonism
Latter Day Saints from Ohio
People excommunicated by the Church of Christ (Latter Day Saints)
People from Huron County, Ohio
People from Pontiac, Michigan
19th-century American newspaper editors
Editors of Michigan newspapers